The Kollam-Kottarakkara Diocese is one of the twenty-four dioceses of the Church of South India. It comprises parishes in Attingal, Vembayam, Chenkulam, Kundara, Kottarakkara, Manjakkala, Punalur and Ayiranelloor regions, which span the Thiruvananthapuram, Kollam and Pathanamthitta districts.

History of the Diocese
Kollam-Kottarakara diocese was formed on 9 April 2015 after a special conference of the Church synod in Chennai. The parishes of the Kollam-Kottarakara diocese were formerly part of the South Kerala Diocese.soon after the firmationew of the Diocese Rt. Rev. Dharmaraj Rasalam was appointested as Moderaters Commissary. 

Bishop Rt. Rev. Dr. Oommen George, former clergy secretary of CSI Madhya Kerala Diocese and the vicar of Ascension Church Kanjikkuzhy,  was selected as the first bishop of Kollam- Kottarakkara diocese. 
A noted speaker at religious conventions, he was selected by a Synod presided over by CSI Moderator Bishop Thomas K Oommen at the Synod headquarters of CSI in Chennai.

The consecration of the bishop- designate was conducted at Kollam CSI Cathedral on Sunday under the chief patronage of Bishop Thomas K Oommen.  Rev Oommen George had worked in various capacities as member of CSI Synod, CSI Synod Mission and Evangelical Committee; executive committee member of Madhya Kerala Diocese; vice- president of CSI North American Council; convener of Shalom Residence Project; secretary of the Mission Board of diocese; secretary of the Pastoral Board; vice-president of the Laity organisation and convener of the Diocese.

During his consecration, he was the secretary of the regional Synod. He is the son of late K C George Upadeshi , an evangelist of the CSI Church and Mallappally Panavelil Rachel.  Aleyamma Oommen is his wife and Diana, Leeza and Leena are his daughters.

Officers of the Diocese
Rev M Franklin - Clergy Secretary.

Mr.Varkey Jacob- Lay Secretary.

Er.PD Benedict Raja - Treasurer.

See also
Church of South India
MadhyaKerala Diocese
East Kerala Diocese
South Kerala Diocese
North Kerala Diocese
Kochi Diocese
Christianity in Kerala

References

Kollam-Kottarakkara
Dioceses in Kerala